Elsmere Public School (ID#16-0101-000) was a school district in Nebraska. It included the community of Elsmere.

It was a K-8 school district.

History
The school was renovated in 1960, and at the time it had one teacher.

In 2004 there were 51 people living in the boundary of the entire district, with four of them living in the community of Elsmere the district employed one teacher and had a single student. The school received science class materials from Valentine High School and an online provider supplied instruction in the Spanish language. Patti Vannoy, a student at the University of Nebraska writing for the Lincoln Journal Star, stated that, referring to long distances, "Roads are a large part of why Elsmere Public School still exists,[...]"

The district was dissolved on June 15, 2006. Valentine Community Schools absorbed the former district.

See also
 List of school districts in Nebraska

References

Former school districts in the United States
School districts in Nebraska
Schools in Cherry County, Nebraska
2000s disestablishments in Nebraska
2006 disestablishments in the United States
School districts disestablished in 2006
Public K–8 schools in the United States
Education in Cherry County, Nebraska